A swoose is a hybrid between a swan and a goose.

References

Bird hybrids